Novyye Burly (Yañı Burlı) is a rural locality (a village) in Tabynsky Selsoviet, Gafuriysky District, Bashkortostan, Russia. The population was 73 as of 2010. There are 2 streets.

Geography 
Novyye Burly is located 29 km north of Krasnousolsky (the district's administrative centre) by road. Beryozovka is the nearest rural locality.

References 

Rural localities in Gafuriysky District